John Desmond Titterington (1 May 1928 – 13 April 2002) was a British racing driver from Northern Ireland.  He was born at Cultra, near Holywood, County Down. He participated in one Formula One World Championship Grand Prix, on 14 July 1956. He scored no championship points. He also competed in several non-Championship Grand Prix. He died in Dundee, Scotland, aged 73.

Complete Formula One World Championship results 
(key)

References

External links
Profile on F1 Rejects

1928 births
2002 deaths
Racing drivers from Northern Ireland
Connaught Formula One drivers
Formula One drivers from Northern Ireland
People from County Down
24 Hours of Le Mans drivers

12 Hours of Reims drivers
Ecurie Ecosse drivers